Zingiber collinsii is a species of plant in the family Zingiberaceae found in Vietnam.

References

collinsii
Flora of Vietnam